Backflash may refer to:

 "Backflash" (Boss), a television episode
 "Backflash" (High Maintenance), a television episode
 Backflash, a 1998 Parker novel by Richard Stark (Donald E. Westlake)
 Backflash, a 2001 film featuring Robert Patrick
 "Backflash", an instrumental by Pink Cream 69 from Games People Play, 1993

See also
 Haplochromis sp. 'backflash cryptodon', a species of fish
 Backlash (disambiguation)
 Black Flash, a DC Comics supervillain
 Blacklash or Whiplash, a Marvel Comics character
 Flashback (disambiguation)